The Pierrefonds River is a tributary of the north shore of the Panache River flowing into Eeyou Istchee James Bay (municipality), in Jamésie, in the area of Nord-du-Québec, Quebec, Canada.

This river successively crosses the townships of Picquet, Prévert and Carpiquet.

Forestry is the main economic activity of the sector; recreational tourism activities, second.

The Pierrefonds River valley is served by the R1051 forest road (East-West direction).

The surface of the Pierrefonds River is usually frozen from early November to mid-May, however safe ice circulation is generally from mid-November to mid-April.

Geography

Toponymy 
At various times in history, this territory has been occupied by the Attikameks, the Algonquin and the Cree.

The name "Pierrefonds River" was made official on December 5, 1968, at the Commission de toponymie du Québec, when it was created.

Notes and references

See also 

Rivers of Nord-du-Québec
Jamésie
Nottaway River drainage basin